American Magic is an American yacht racing team formed to compete for the 36th America's Cup. They represent the New York Yacht Club and were founded by formed in 2018 by principals Hap Fauth, Roger Penske, and Doug DeVos.

American Magic was eliminated from the Prada Cup semi-finals by Luna Rossa Prada Pirelli on Saturday 30 January 2021, after 4 consecutive defeats.  In August 2021 the Team signaled their intent to race in the 37th America's Cup competition.

History

The team was established in October 2017 with the intention to return the America's Cup to the United States and the NYYC. Management consists of John J. "Hap" Fauth's Bella Mente Racing, Doug DeVos's Quantum Racing, and Roger Penske under the NYYC burgee.

The Team name, "American Magic" refers to the first Cup winner, the yacht America of 1851, and the first defender, the yacht Magic, who won in 1870. The America's Cup trophy was held by the NYYC for 132 years until 1983. The NYYC's reign was the longest winning streak - as measured by years - in the history of all sports.

Dean Barker was the helmsman, with Terry Hutchinson as skipper.

As of 2022 their home port is Pensacola, Florida.

36th America's Cup

The Team first entered international competition on 15 January 2021 in the 2021 Prada Cup.  On 17 January during the round-robin stage Patriot capsized while rounding Gate 5 when a gust of wind caught the sails causing the leeward running backstay to not release and preventing the mainsail from being eased. No crew was reported injured but the incident caused a large hole in the hull and for a time it was at significant risk of sinking. Hutchinson and Barker were on board. Per race rules, Luna Rossa Challenge was awarded the victory.

The team returned to racing for the Prada Cup Semi-Final, but American Magic was eliminated from the competition by Luna Rossa Prada Pirelli on Saturday 30 January 2021, after 4 consecutive defeats.

37th America's Cup
On 16 August 2021, Hap Fauth announced the Team's intention to enter the 37th America's Cup.  Further that the Team named Scott Ferguson as lead Design Coordinator, previously with Luna Rossa (Rig Design Manager 2000-2007), Oracle Team USA (Wing / Rig Design Manager 2007-2013, Design Coordinator / Senior Designer 2014-2017).

On 18 February 2022, American Magic announced their leadership team for the 37th America's Cup, with two notable changes, the addition of Mike Cazer as CEO and Tyson Lamond as COO.

In May 2022, AM announced that Australian Tom Slingsby had joined the team.  Slingsby won Gold in the 2012 London Olympics in Men's Laser class and was on the 2013 America's Cup-winning Oracle Team USA.  A likely competitor for the 37th America's Cup, Team INEOS Britannia skipper Sir Ben Ainslie also won a Gold Medal in the 2012 Olympics in the Finn class.

Fleet
The team has two America's Cup 75 class (AC75) boats.  The AC75 is a 75 ft sailing hydrofoil monohull class specifically designed for the 36th America's Cup. The team also built an 'American Magic 38' (AM38) foiling monohull using a modified McConaghy 38 monohull, known as The Mule.

References

External links
Official website
Official Youtube Page

American Magic